The 2001–02 NBA season was the fourteenth and final season for the original Charlotte Hornets in the National Basketball Association. During the off-season, the Hornets acquired George Lynch and Robert Traylor from the Philadelphia 76ers in a three-team trade, and signed free agents Stacey Augmon, Bryce Drew and three-point specialist Matt Bullard. The Hornets struggled playing around .500 in the first half of the season, holding a 23–25 record at the All-Star break. Jamal Mashburn only played just 40 games due to a lower abdominal strain, and was replaced with second-year forward Lee Nailon as the team's starting small forward. Despite losing Mashburn, the Hornets posted a 7-game winning streak in March, and finished the season second in the Central Division with a 44–38 record, and qualified for their third straight playoff appearance.

Mashburn averaged 21.5 points, 6.1 rebounds and 4.3 assists per game, while Baron Davis continued to show improvement, averaging 18.1 points, 8.5 assists and 2.1 steals per game, and was selected for the 2002 NBA All-Star Game, and David Wesley provided the team with 14.2 points and 3.5 assists per game. In addition, Elden Campbell contributed 13.9 points, 6.9 rebounds and 1.8 blocks per game, while Nailon provided with 10.8 points per game, P.J. Brown averaged 8.4 points and 9.8 rebounds per game, and second-year center Jamaal Magloire contributed 8.5 points and 5.6 rebounds per game off the bench.

The Hornets defeated the Orlando Magic 3–1 in the Eastern Conference First Round of the playoffs, but lost 4–1 in the Eastern Conference Semi-finals to the top-seeded New Jersey Nets. The Nets would go on to reach the NBA Finals for the first time, but would lose to the Los Angeles Lakers in four straight games. Following the season, Nailon and Bullard were both released to free agency.

This was also the team's final season in Charlotte, as the Hornets relocated to New Orleans, Louisiana, and became the New Orleans Hornets next season. Other city candidates for the team's relocation included Louisville, Kentucky, Norfolk, Virginia and St. Louis, Missouri. The Hornets also finished twenty-ninth (last) in attendance for the season, a stark contrast to their earlier years in Charlotte, plus posting a better 23–18 road record than their 21–20 record at home. The city of Charlotte would return to the NBA two seasons later with the expansion Charlotte Bobcats, who began play in the 2004–05 season. That franchise changed its name to the Hornets in 2014 after the original franchise renamed itself the Pelicans, and also reclaimed the original Hornets' history from 1988 to 2002. As a result, the Hornets are now reckoned as having suspended operations after this season before returning as the Bobcats in 2004.

Offseason

NBA draft

Roster

Regular season

Season standings

z – clinched division title
y – clinched division title
x – clinched playoff spot

Record vs. opponents

Game log

Playoffs

|- align="center" bgcolor="ccffcc"
| 1
| April 20
| Orlando
| W 80–79
| Baron Davis (28)
| P. J. Brown (15)
| Baron Davis (7)
| Charlotte Coliseum9,505
| 1–0
|- align="center" bgcolor="ffcccc"
| 2
| April 23
| Orlando
| L 103–111 (OT)
| Elden Campbell (27)
| Elden Campbell (13)
| Baron Davis (10)
| Charlotte Coliseum10,323
| 1–1
|- align="center" bgcolor="ccffcc"
| 3
| April 27
| @ Orlando
| W 110–100 (OT)
| Baron Davis (33)
| Baron Davis (14)
| Baron Davis (10)
| TD Waterhouse Centre16,754
| 2–1
|- align="center" bgcolor="ccffcc"
| 4
| April 30
| @ Orlando
| W 102–85
| Baron Davis (28)
| Baron Davis (11)
| Baron Davis (10)
| TD Waterhouse Centre16,254
| 3–1

|- align="center" bgcolor="ffcccc"
| 1
| May 5
| @ New Jersey
| L 93–99
| Baron Davis (23)
| P. J. Brown (9)
| David Wesley (7)
| Continental Airlines Arena19,071
| 0–1
|- align="center" bgcolor="ffcccc"
| 2
| May 7
| @ New Jersey
| L 88–102
| Baron Davis (21)
| George Lynch (11)
| Baron Davis (7)
| Continental Airlines Arena20,049
| 0–2
|- align="center" bgcolor="ccffcc"
| 3
| May 9
| New Jersey
| W 115–97
| Baron Davis (26)
| George Lynch (12)
| Baron Davis (8)
| Charlotte Coliseum11,363
| 1–2
|- align="center" bgcolor="ffcccc"
| 4
| May 12
| New Jersey
| L 79–89
| Baron Davis (20)
| P. J. Brown (16)
| Baron Davis (6)
| Charlotte Coliseum13,864
| 1–3
|- align="center" bgcolor="ffcccc"
| 5
| May 15
| @ New Jersey
| L 95–103
| Magloire, Nailon (14)
| George Lynch (13)
| Baron Davis (8)
| Continental Airlines Arena20,049
| 1–4
|-

Player statistics

Season

Playoffs

Awards and records

Transactions
 June 14, 2001

Traded a 2001 2nd round draft pick (Sean Lampley was later selected) to the Chicago Bulls for Roberto Dueñas.
 July 24, 2001

Signed Bryce Drew as a free agent.
 July 25, 2001

Signed Stacey Augmon as a free agent.
 August 13, 2001

Signed Matt Bullard as a free agent.
 October 25, 2001

As part of a 3-team trade, the Charlotte Hornets traded Derrick Coleman to the Philadelphia 76ers; the Charlotte Hornets traded cash to the Golden State Warriors; the Golden State Warriors traded Chris Porter to the Charlotte Hornets; the Golden State Warriors traded Corie Blount and Vonteego Cummings to the Philadelphia 76ers; the Philadelphia 76ers traded George Lynch, Jérôme Moïso and Robert Traylor to the Charlotte Hornets; and the Philadelphia 76ers traded Cedric Henderson and a 2005 1st round draft pick (Joey Graham was later selected) to the Golden State Warriors.
 October 26, 2001

Waived Chris Porter.
 October 29, 2001

Waived Tim James.
 November 19, 2001

Waived Eldridge Recasner.

Player Transactions Citation:

References

Char
Charlotte Hornets seasons
Bob
Bob